Hui Chen is an American physicist, currently at Lawrence Livermore National Laboratory and an Elected Fellow of the American Physical Society.

References

Year of birth missing (living people)
Living people
Fellows of the American Physical Society
21st-century American physicists